ARA Azopardo or Azopardo may refer to one the following vessels of the Argentine Navy, named after Juan Bautista Azopardo, an Argentine naval officer:

 , 1885–1922, was a transport
 , 1922–1943, was a tugboat
 , 1955–1972, was a frigate

Azopardo may also refer to one the following vessels of the Argentine Naval Prefecture, with same namesake:

 , a former US Navy  transferred to Argentina
 , a Mantilla-class patrol boat in service since 1983

See also 
 Azopardo (disambiguation page)

Ships of Argentina
Argentine Navy ship names